Elaine Barrie (née Jacobs; July 16, 1915 – March 1, 2003) was an American actress who appeared in several films and one Broadway play. She was the fourth, and last, wife of actor John Barrymore.

Biography
Barrie was the daughter of a traveling salesman named Louis Jacobs. She claimed to have fallen in love with Barrymore in 1931, when she was 16, after seeing his film, the classic Svengali. She met him when, while a sophomore at Hunter College, she visited his hospital room on the pretense of needing to interview a celebrity for a class assignment. They married in 1936 at Yuma, Arizona, but the marriage was a rocky one and they finally divorced in 1940.

In 1937, shortly before her final divorce, she was sued by E. K. Nadel to prevent her from appearing in Dwain Esper's How to Undress in Front of Your Husband, on the grounds that the title had been copyrighted by Sherill C. Coben.

She moved to Port-au-Prince, Haiti around 1958, and worked as a handbag designer. She lived in Haiti for an unknown number of years before returning to the United States. Barrie died in New York City at the age of 87.

References

External links
 
 

1915 births
2003 deaths
Actresses from New York City
American film actresses
20th-century American memoirists
American women memoirists
American stage actresses
20th-century American actresses
21st-century American women